Pressha is an American R&B singer.

His first single was the 1995 single "Put Ya Thang Down"; then, as a member of the Southsyde B.O.I.Z., he released "Get Ready, Here It Comes (Choo Choo)". His only album was a 1998 effort released on LaFace Records, which spawned the U.S. Billboard Hot 100 top forty hit, "Splackavellie".

Discography

Album
Don't Get It Twisted (LaFace Records, 1998) US R&B #98

Singles
"Put Ya Thang Down" (1995)
"Get Ready, Here it Comes (Choo Choo)" (1995) (with the Southsyde B.O.I.Z.)
"Do Boy" (1998)
"Splackavellie" (1998) #27 U.S., #14 U.S. R&B

References

External links
Pressha at MySpace

Year of birth missing (living people)
Living people
American male singers